Dalton Park is a shopping centre on the outskirts of Murton, County Durham, England. It is the largest factory outlet style shopping centre in North East, England.

Shops 
The Centre comprises 75 stores, including 7 restaurants.
Anchor tenants include Marks and Spencer Outlet, Next Clearance and Adidas. The shopping centre offers over 1500 free parking spaces and a dedicated coach pickup/drop off point.

The Gap Outlet anchor store closed in September 2021, following an announcement in July of that year that over 80 of their stores would close.

Ownership
ING Real Estate owned Dalton Park until it was sold to Peveril Securities in September 2013. A further off-market sale occurred in June 2015 which resulted in Janus Henderson UK Property (PAIF), a division of TH Real Estate acquiring the Centre for £38 million.

Developments

In September 2016 a seven-screen Cineworld cinema opened along with outlets for Frankie and Benny's, KFC, Pizza Express and Prezzo.

A Morrisons Store with an adjoining Petrol station were also built. The petrol station opened on June 8, 2020, after being granted planning permission in 2014 and being built in 2016.

In August 2020 it was announced the Morrison’s store which has been empty since 2016 would open in time for Christmas 2020. In November 2020, company bosses confirmed the store is scheduled to open on 26 November. The store opened as scheduled on 26 November.

The development was part of a £45 million investment into expanding the shopping centre.

In June 2017 it was announced that almost £2 million would be spent on refurbishing the centre including redecoration of shop fronts, improvements to the lighting & flooring and landscaping in front of the centre and improved toilets.

As of August 2020, only KFC & Morrison’s remains from the redevelopment. Prezzo closed in March 2018, after less than 2 years. In Summer 2020, both Frankie & Bennys’s and Pizza Express announced their closure. Some cited the economic situation caused by coronavirus as the primary reason for closing.

In September 2020 it was announced a number of new retailers would be coming to Dalton Park including Costa Coffee, Molton Brown and Lazy Jacks. As of November 2020, all three stores had opened in the centre. 

In August 2021, Dalton Park opened a £60,000 accessible play area with features including an extra wide slide, a wheelchair roundabout and easy access ramps.

Transport Links

Bus 
Multiple Go North East services serve Dalton Park. This includes the X6 & 61(A) services between Peterlee & Sunderland, the X-lines X10 between Middlesbrough & Newcastle upon Tyne, and the 65 service between Durham & Seaham. The Arriva North East 22 service from Durham to Sunderland serves Dalton Park and takes just over an hour from Durham Bus Station or 25 minutes from Sunderland Bus Station.

Rail 
Seaham railway station is located near by with frequent train services operated by Northern Trains. Bus services from the train station to Dalton Park take around 25 minutes.

References

External links
 

Buildings and structures in County Durham
Shopping centres in County Durham
Outlet malls in England
Murton, County Durham